Wudian is a town in Mudan District, in the northwestern suburbs of Heze, Shandong, People's Republic of China, located  from downtown Heze. , it has one residential community and 37 villages under its administration.

See also 
 List of township-level divisions of Shandong

References 

Township-level divisions of Shandong